CE-123 is an analog of modafinil, the most researched of a series of structurally related heterocyclic derivatives. In animal studies, CE-123 was found to improve performance on tests of learning and memory in a manner consistent with a nootropic effect profile.

See also 
 Adrafinil
 CRL-40,940
 JZ-IV-10

References 

Acetamides
Designer drugs
Dopamine reuptake inhibitors
Nootropics
Stimulants
Sulfoxides
Thiazoles